John Farquhar Munro (Gaelic: Iain Fearchar Rothach; 26 August 1934 – 26 January 2014) was a Scottish Liberal Democrat politician.  He was the Member of the Scottish Parliament (MSP) for Ross, Skye and Inverness West from 1999 until his retirement in 2011.

Previously a crofter and a local councillor for 33 years, he was first elected to the Scottish Parliament at the 1999 election.  Running against him for Labour was Donnie Munro, former member of the band Runrig, but Munro won by 1,539 votes. He was one of three Lib-Dem MSPs to oppose his party's coalition with the Labour Party (along with Keith Raffan and Donald Gorrie) and has deviated from the Executive on a number of issues (such as land reform, on which he believes they are not moving quickly enough).

He was prominent within the parliament in opposing the Skye Bridge tolls, to the extent of threatening to resign from the Lib Dems if they were not removed. The tolls were abolished in December 2004.

As befitted one of the few native Gaelic speakers in the Scottish Parliament he co-sponsored (along with the Scottish National Party's Michael Russell) a bill to secure the language's status as being equal to English. He was angry when the Labour-Liberal Scottish Executive refused to back it.

He was re-elected to the Scottish Parliament at the 2003 election with an increased share of the vote.

After the 2007 election he was the oldest MSP in Holyrood. He stepped down as an MSP at the 2011 Scottish Parliament general election, at which time his constituency was abolished.

In a surprise move Munro expressed support for Alex Salmond in the 2011 Scottish Parliament elections.

He was a keen player and supporter of the sport of shinty, supporting local side Kinlochshiel.John Farquhar Munro, Ardelve

He died at his home on 26 January 2014.

References

External links
 
 John Farquhar Munro MSP profile at the site of Scottish Liberal Democrats
 Obituary

1934 births
2014 deaths
People from Skye and Lochalsh
Liberal Democrat MSPs
Members of the Scottish Parliament 1999–2003
Members of the Scottish Parliament 2003–2007
Members of the Scottish Parliament 2007–2011
People educated at Plockton High School
Shinty players